A chain letter is a letter requesting that the recipient distribute copies of it to others.

Chain letter may also refer to:
Chain Letter (film), a 2010 horror film
Chain Letter (album), by Brooke Valentine
Chain Letter (U.S. game show), the 1966 U.S. game show
Chain Letters, a UK game show
Chain Letters (album), an album by Supastition

See also 
Chain mail (disambiguation)